Koko Taylor is the 1969 debut album by American blues singer Koko Taylor, released on MCA/Chess Records. It has received positive critical reception.

Reception
The editorial staff of AllMusic Guide gave Koko Taylor 4.5 out of five stars, with reviewer Bill Dahl commenting that it "is one of the strongest representations of the belter's Chess days available".

Track listing
All songs written by Willie Dixon, except where noted
"Love You Like a Woman" (Morris Dollison) – 2:06
"I Love a Lover Like You" (Choice, Glover, and Merriwether) – 2:43
"Don't Mess with the Messer" – 2:42
"I Don't Care Who Knows" – 2:10
"Wang Dang Doodle" – 2:58
"I'm a Little Mixed Up" (Betty James and Clarence Johnson) – 2:39
"Nitty Gritty" (Koko Taylor) – 2:42
"Fire" – 2:28
"Whatever I Am You Made Me" – 2:25
"Twenty Nine Ways" – 3:09
"Insane Asylum" – 4:15
"Yes, It's Good For You" – 2:39
2001 reissue bonus tracks
"Love Sick Tears" (unknown) – 2:47
"He Always Knocks Me Out" (unknown) – 3:04

Personnel
Personnel and recording dates for all tracks are unknown. The following details come from the 2001 CD re-release liner notes:

"Love You Like a Woman" (recorded October 1968)
Koko Taylor – vocals
"I Love a Lover Like You" (recorded )
Koko Taylor – vocals
Willie Dixon – bass guitar
Buddy Guy – guitar
Walter "Shakey" Horton – harmonica
Clifton James – drums
Albert "Sunnyland Slim" Luandrew – piano
Matt Murphy – guitar (possibly)
Johnny Shines – guitar (possibly)
"Don’t Mess with the Messer" (recorded on )
Koko Taylor – vocals
Willie Dixon – double bass
Buddy Guy – guitar
Clifton James – drums
Lafayette Leake – piano
Matt Murphy – guitar
unknown saxophone players and background vocalists
"I Don’t Care Who Knows" (recorded October 1968)
Koko Taylor – vocals
"Wang Dang Doodle" (recorded on )
Koko Taylor – vocals
Gene Barge – saxophone
Fred Below – drums
Willie Dixon – backing vocals
Buddy Guy – guitar
Donald Hankins – saxophone
Lafayette Leake – piano
Jack Meyers – bass guitar
Johnny "Twist" Williams – guitar
"I’m a Little Mixed Up" (recorded in 1965)
Koko Taylor – vocals
Gene Barge – tenor saxophone
Willie Dixon – double bass
Buddy Guy – guitar
Clifton James – drums
Lafayette Leake – piano
unknown background vocalists
"Nitty Gritty"
Koko Taylor – vocals
Buddy Guy – guitar
Walter "Shakey" Horton – harmonic
Clifton James – drums
Lafayette Leake – piano (possibly)
Albert "Sunnyland Slim" Luandrew – piano (possibly)
Jack Meyers – bass guitar
Matt Murphy – guitar (possibly)
Johnny Shines – guitar (possibly)
"Fire" (recorded August 1967)
Koko Taylor – vocals
Gene Barge – tenor saxophone
Willie Dixon – vocals
Buddy Guy – guitar
Lafayette Leake – piano, organ
Johnny "Twist" Williams – guitar
unknown bass guitarist and drummer
"Whatever I Am, You Made Me" (recorded )
Koko Taylor – vocals
Willie Dixon – double bass
Buddy Guy – guitar
Clifton James – drums
Lafayette Leake – piano
Matt Murphy – guitar
unknown saxophonist and background vocalist
"Twenty-Nine Ways"
Koko Taylor – vocals
Willie Dixon – double bass
Buddy Guy – guitar
Walter "Shakey" Horton – harmonica
Clifton James – drums
Lafayette Leake – piano (possibly)
Albert "Sunnyland Slim" Luandrew – piano (possibly)
Matt Murphy – guitar (possibly)
Johnny Shines – guitar (possibly)
"Insane Asylum" (recorded August 1967)
Koko Taylor – vocals
Gene Barge – tenor saxophone
Willie Dixon – vocals
Buddy Guy – guitar 
Lafayette Leake – piano, organ
Johnny "Twist" Williams – guitar 
unknown bass guitarist and drummer
"Yes, It’s Good for You" (recorded October 1968)
Koko Taylor – vocals
"Love Sick Tears" (recorded )
Koko Taylor – vocals
Willie Dixon – double bass
Clifton James – drums
Buddy Guy – guitar
Matt Murphy – guitar
Lafayette Leake – piano
"He Always Knocks Me Out"
Koko Taylor – vocals
Willie Dixon – double bass
Buddy Guy – guitar
Walter "Shakey" Horton – harmonica
Clifton James – drums
Lafayette Leake – piano (possibly)
Matt Murphy – guitar (possibly)
Albert "Sunnyland Slim" Luandrew – piano (possibly)
Johnny Shines – guitar (possibly)
Technical personnel
Gene Barge – arrangement
Malcolm Chisholm – engineering
Willie Dixon – arrangement, production
Ron Malo – engineering
Don Wilson – illustration
Reissue personnel
Geary Chansley – photography
Bill Dahl – liner notes
Daily Planet – cover design
Mike Diehl – design
Doug Fulton – photograhy
Erick Labson – remastering at Universal Mastering Studios
Andy McKaie – reissue production
Bob Schnieders – research
Leni Sinclair – inlay photography
Vartan – art direction

References

External links

1969 debut albums
Koko Taylor albums
Chess Records albums
MCA Records albums
Albums produced by Willie Dixon